Patrik Csoór (born 19 January 1991 in Budapest) is a professional Hungarian footballer.

References

External links
 HLSZ 
 MLSZ 

1991 births
Living people
Footballers from Budapest
Hungarian footballers
Association football forwards
Vasas SC players